Rafflesiales is a botanical name of an order of flowering plants. The name was first published  by Oliver in 1895. The Cronquist system used this name for an order placed in subclass Rosidae with the following circumscription (1981) :

 order Rafflesiales
 family Hydnoraceae
 family Mitrastemonaceae
 family Rafflesiaceae

The APG II system regards Rafflesiaceae as an unplaced family of three genera. Also unplaced is the genus Mitrastema. However, APG II does have a placement for family Hydnoraceae, in the order Piperales. 

According to the 
 AP-Website, recent research places Rafflesiaceae in order Malpighiales.

Historically recognized angiosperm orders